Strikes Again is the third album released by the Funk band Rose Royce on the Whitfield label in August 1978. It was produced by Norman Whitfield.

History
The album peaked at #4 on the R&B albums chart. It also reached #28 on the Billboard 200. It yielded two Billboard R&B Top Ten singles, "I'm in Love (And I Love the Feeling)" and "Love Don't Live Here Anymore". "Love Don't Live Here Anymore" was also successful on the UK Singles Chart, reaching #2, their highest charting single in the UK.  A third single, "First Come, First Serve", was only moderately successful, peaking at #65 on the Billboard R&B Singles chart. The album was remastered and reissued with bonus tracks in 2016 by Big Break Records.

Track listing

Personnel
Rose Royce
Gwen Dickey – lead vocals
Kenny Copeland – trumpet, lead vocals
Kenji Brown – guitar, lead vocals
Lequeint "Duke" Jobe – bass, vocals
Michael Nash – keyboards
Henry Garner – drums, vocals
Freddie Dunn – trumpet
Michael Moore – saxophone
Terry Santiel – congas

Additional musicians
Victor Nyx, Mark Davis – keyboards
Melvin "Wah Wah" Watson, Cornelius Grant – guitar
Jimmy Valdez – drums
Walter Downing – organ
Mark Kenoly – bass
Jack Ashford – percussion

Production
Norman Whitfield – producer, arranger, mastering engineer
Leanard Jackson –  Chief recording engineer mastering engineer*
Steve Smith – recording engineer,
Gene Page – orchestral direction
Eleven Twenty-Four Design – art direction, design
Andy Engel – lettering
Bobby Holland, Jeffrey Mayer – photography
Pamela Clare – cover illustration
Bill Whitfield – album coordinator

Charts

Singles

References

External links
 

1978 albums
Rose Royce albums
Albums produced by Norman Whitfield
Whitfield Records albums